Maria Petrovna Buynosova-Rostovskaya (Буйносова-Ростовская, Мария Петровна in Russian) (born as Catherine - died 2 January 1626) was the second spouse and only tsarina consort of Tsar Vasili IV of Russia.

Life
Maria Buynosova-Rostovskaya was the daughter of prince Piotr Buynosov-Rostovskiy. The wedding took place on 17 January 1608.

In 1610, Vasili was deposed. After the deposition of her consort, Maria was forced to enter a convent. As a nun, she took the name Elena. Her youngest daughter, by then newborn, joined her and became a nun when adult.

Issue 
 Tsarevna Anna Vasilievna (1609-1609), died in infancy
 Tsarevna Anastasia Vasilievna (1610-died unknown year), a nun.

References

Белокуров С. А. Разрядные записи за Смутное время (7113-7121 гг.). М., 1907. С. 95, 249, 269—271 (Чин бракосочетания царя Василия Ивановича Шуйского с княжною Мариею (Екатериною) Буйносовой-Ростовской).

|-

|-

1626 deaths
17th-century Russian people
17th-century Russian women
Russian tsarinas
Year of birth unknown
Vasili IV of Russia